Jennifer Dowds (born 1959) is a Northern Irish international lawn bowler.

Bowls career
Dowds won the bronze medal in the fours at the 2008 World Outdoor Bowls Championship in Christchurch.

In 2007 she won the singles bronze medal at the Atlantic Bowls Championships and two years later won the pairs bronze medal at the 2009 Atlantic Bowls Championships.

Additionally she won the 1997 pairs and 2012 fours title at the Irish National Bowls Championships bowling for the Ballymoney and Ballymena Bowls Clubs respectively.

References

Female lawn bowls players from Northern Ireland
Living people
1959 births